Marcel Büchel (born 18 March 1991) is a professional footballer who plays as a midfielder for Italian club Ascoli. Born in Austria, he represents Liechtenstein at international level.

Club career

Early career
Born in Feldkirch, Austria, Büchel began his career with the youth teams of Swiss club FC St. Gallen and Italian club Siena. Büchel signed a season-long loan deal with Juventus for the 2010–11 season, and made his professional debut for Juventus in the 2010–11 UEFA Europa League, in a group stage match against Austrian team Red Bull Salzburg on 4 November 2010.

On 1 July 2011, Büchel was sent out on loan to Serie B side Gubbio on a season-long deal. He finished the 2011–12 Serie B campaign having made 17 league appearances for the club, and scoring 1 goal. Büchel spent the next season out on loan to Cremonese.

Juventus
On 31 January 2013, it was officially communicated that Büchel was sold to former club Juventus in a co-ownership deal. In exchange, Siena also signed Juventus' Primavera captain Andrea Schiavone, also on a co-ownership deal. As part of the negotiations, Büchel's loan spell at Cremonese would continue. He was called up to the Juventus first team by head coach Antonio Conte, as part of a 31-man squad for their pre-season training camp in Valle d'Aosta on 11 July 2013.

On 2 September 2013, Büchel was officially loaned out to Virtus Lanciano on a season-long deal, that expired on 30 June 2014

On 26 August 2014, Büchel was officially loaned out to Bologna on a season-long deal, that expired 30 June 2015.

Empoli
On 31 August 2015, he was loaned out to Empoli.

On 22 June 2016, Empoli bought Büchel's contract outright from Juventus, for €1.5 million transfer fee.

Hellas Verona
Büchel signed with Hellas Verona in August 2017 on loan with a purchase option.

Juve Stabia 
After being released by Empoli at the end of the 2018–19 season, Büchel had an unsuccessful trial with Serie A team Roma.

On 4 November 2019 it was announced that Büchel had joined Juve Stabia of Serie B, wearing the number 50 shirt.

He made his debut for Juve Stabia in a 2-0 defeat to Virtus Entella, playing for 76 minutes before being subbed off for Massimiliano Carlini.

Ascoli
On 16 September 2020 he signed a one-year contract with Ascoli with an option to renew.

International career
On 18 September 2015, it was announced that Büchel had acquired Liechtensteiner citizenship and was named in their squad for the upcoming UEFA Euro 2016 qualifiers in October.

Career statistics

Club

International 

Scores and results list Liechtenstein's goal tally first.

References

1991 births
Living people
Liechtenstein footballers
Liechtenstein international footballers
Austrian footballers
Austria youth international footballers
A.C.N. Siena 1904 players
Juventus F.C. players
A.S. Gubbio 1910 players
U.S. Cremonese players
Bologna F.C. 1909 players
Empoli F.C. players
Hellas Verona F.C. players
S.S. Juve Stabia players
Ascoli Calcio 1898 F.C. players
Serie A players
Serie B players
Austrian expatriate footballers
Expatriate footballers in Italy
Association football midfielders
Austrian expatriate sportspeople in Italy
Liechtenstein expatriate sportspeople in Italy
Austrian people of Liechtenstein descent
People with acquired Liechtenstein citizenship
People from Feldkirch, Vorarlberg
Footballers from Vorarlberg